Legends & Lattes: A Novel of High Fantasy and Low Stakes is a fantasy novel written by American author Travis Baldree. It was first published in trade paperback and ebook by Cryptid Press in February, 2022; a second edition was issued in trade paperback by Tor Books in November of the same year, with the first British edition issued in hardcover and ebook by Tor UK in the same month. The second edition includes an added prequel story, "Pages to Fill: A Legends & Lattes Story."

The novel was nominated for the 2022 Goodreads Choice Award for Best Fantasy and the 2023 Nebula Award for Best Novel.

Plot summary
Orc swordswoman and mercenary Viv has long made a rough living as one of a band of adventurers—dandyish elf Fennus, dwarf Roon, stone-fey Taivus, and gnome Gallina. Viv dreams of retiring from adventure and opening a coffee shop, in preference to the more customary Orc retirement plan of dying in battle. The band's latest foray, against a Scalvert Queen, a spider-like monster and hoarder of treasure, offers her the opportunity. Claiming as her sole share of the treasure the Scalvert's Stone the monster has grown in its skull, Viv quits the group.

A Scalvert's Stone is reputed to bring fortune to its owner. Purchasing an abandoned stable in the town of Thune, Viv buries the stone inside and sets about realizing her dream. She recruits hob carpenter Calamity (Cal) to help her get the property in shape, and artistic succubus Tandri as a work-mate with whom to open and run the business. Subsequent recruits include ratkin Thimble, a baker of genius, hesitant would-be bard Pendry, who blossoms into an entertainer, and volunteer watch beast Amity the dire-cat. 

After a slow start, the Legends & Lattes coffee shop becomes highly popular in Thune, with such colorful regulars among the clientele as witch Laney, student Hemmington, and magician gnome Durias, who appears to have a peculiar relationship with time. Viv and Tandri's success garners unwanted attention from the Madrigal, whose thugs run the local protection racket, and Viv's ex-colleague Fennus, who suspects the true nature of the seemingly modest share she claimed of the Scalvert's treasure. With the aid of the rest of Viv's old band, notably Taivus, matters with the Madrigal are resolved satisfactorily, but Fennus is implacable, making two attempts to steal the Scalvert's Stone, the second of which results in the cafe's destruction in a magical blaze.

With support from the friends Viv has made, Legends & Lattes is eventually rebuilt and soon thriving more than ever, despite the loss of the stone. Fennus, however, fares less well with his prize. It seems the powers of the Scalvert's Stone have been misrepresented. It doesn't bring good fortune, but rather attracts to its bearer others of like mind. To Viv, striving to build a good thing in her community, it brought helpers. To malignant, selfish Fennus it draws individuals of a very different sort...

Second edition bonus story
The Tor edition includes an added prequel story, "Pages to Fill: A Legends & Lattes Story." It relates one of the final adventures of Viv's band prior to hunting the Scalvert Queen. In the gnomish city of Azimuth, they are tasked with capturing the dapplegrim (shapeshifter) Bodkin, a legendary thief, and recovering certain property she stole. Bodkin escapes their initial pursuit, but leaves behind a satchel containing small bottles of paint.

The crew splits up to learn what they can from this material, Viv and Gallina visiting the local Athenaeum to pinpoint where one bottle might have been bought. Viv, already contemplating her retirement and the means to secure it, takes the opportunity to research scalverts while there, filling her notebook with new information.

The two follow the trail of the paint to the dwelling of Leyton, a clockmaker, with whom Bodkin lives in the guise of his elfin lover Valeya. Viv secures the booty the band had been hired to recover before Bodkin returns. In a final struggle with the thief, Viv learns the dapplegrim had actually given up thievery for Leyton's sake, and considering her own dreams decides to let her go.

Afterwards Viv and Gallina pass a café, a relatively new business in town, and go in. When served a cup of coffee, Viv's dream for her the next phase of her life finally comes into focus. She wishes she had brought her notebook; she has pages left to fill!

Reception

Publishers Weekly characterizes the novel as "a gentle little cozy set against an epic fantasy backdrop," noting "[t]his charming outing will please anyone who’s ever wished to spend time in a fantasy world without all the quests and battles."

Sarah Rice in Booklist calls the book "a novel, and shop, that will delight anyone who enjoys coffee shop alternate universes, slow-burn romances, and the vindication of friendship." She feels "[t]his setup combined with the positive messages of defying societal stereotypes, letting go of violence to build peace, and trusting in your friends feels like a premise from Terry Pratchett’s Discworld."

Notes

2022 American novels
2022 fantasy novels
Orcs in popular culture
Tor Books books